Pseudotetracha australasiae is a species of tiger beetle in the subfamily Cicindelinae. It was described by Hope in 1842. It is endemic to Australia.

References

Beetles described in 1842
Endemic fauna of Australia
Beetles of Australia